The Atlantic 10 Conference (A-10) is a collegiate athletic conference whose schools compete in the National Collegiate Athletic Association's (NCAA) Division I. The A-10's member schools are located in states mostly on the United States Eastern Seaboard, as well as some in the Midwest: Massachusetts, New York, North Carolina, Pennsylvania, Rhode Island, Virginia, Ohio, Illinois, and Missouri as well as in the District of Columbia. Although some of its members are state-funded, half of its membership is made up of private, Catholic institutions. Despite the name, there are 15 full-time members, and four affiliate members that participate in women's field hockey and men's lacrosse. The current commissioner is Bernadette McGlade, who began her tenure in 2008.

History

The Atlantic 10 Conference was founded in 1975 as the Eastern Collegiate Basketball League (ECBL) and began conference play in 1976. At that time, basketball was its only sport. After its first season, it added sports other than basketball and changed its name to the Eastern Athletic Association. However, despite its official names, it was popularly known as the Eastern 8, as it then had eight members (Villanova, Duquesne, Penn State, West Virginia, George Washington, Massachusetts, Pittsburgh, and Rutgers).

After changes in membership that saw charter members Villanova and Pittsburgh leave (in 1980 and 1982, respectively) and new members St. Bonaventure (1979), Rhode Island (1980), Saint Joseph's (1982), and Temple (1982) enter, establishing the league with 10 members, the conference adopted the current Atlantic 10 name in 1982.

Further membership changes saw the league expand to its maximum of 16 members. From 1997 through 2006, the league also operated a football conference; during that period, more than 20 schools were participating in A-10 competition in at least one sport. This ended when the A-10 football programs all departed to join a new football conference sponsored by the Colonial Athletic Association (CAA). In 2012, Butler joined the conference after leaving the Horizon League and VCU joined after leaving the CAA.

Conference realignment in 2013 saw the departure of Temple to the American Athletic Conference, Butler and Xavier to the reconfigured Big East, and Charlotte to Conference USA.  George Mason joined from the CAA, and Davidson from the Southern Conference announced it would join in 2014.

The league headquarters have been located in Newport News, Virginia since fall 2009.  Prior to that, the headquarters was in Philadelphia, within a few miles of member schools Saint Joseph's and La Salle.

The conference currently has media deals with ESPN, CBS Sports Network, NBC Sports, and digital broadcasts with ESPN+.

On November 16, 2021, Loyola University Chicago announced that its athletic program - the Loyola Ramblers - would depart the Missouri Valley Conference and join the A-10 effective July 1, 2022.

The latest change to the A-10 was announced on May 23, 2022 with the addition of men's lacrosse for the 2023 season (2022–23 school year). The four full members that sponsor the sport (Richmond, St. Bonaventure, Saint Joseph's, UMass) were joined by affiliate members High Point and Hobart.

Member schools

Current members

Full members
The following is a list of the full members of the conference and the year they joined:

Notes

Associate members
The "joined" column indicates the calendar year in which each school became an A-10 associate, which for spring sports such as lacrosse is the year before the first season of competition.

Former members

Former full members
None of these institutions played football in the A-10 during their tenure as full members.

Notes

Former associate members

Former football-only members
After expansion in the Colonial Athletic Association brought that conference to 6 football-playing schools, it was agreed that the CAA would take over management of the Atlantic 10's football conference starting in the 2007–08 school year. All the schools on this list (except Boston U. and Connecticut) were in the A-10 football conference when it became CAA Football (technically separate from the all-sports CAA), but Hofstra and Northeastern discontinued their football programs after the 2009–10 school year. Membership dates include time in the Yankee Conference (which was an all-sports conference from the 1947–48 to 1975–76 seasons, and a football-only conference after that) which merged into the A-10 in the 1997–98 school year.

Notes

Membership timeline

   

Notes

* - Virginia Tech did not participate in wrestling.

Atlantic 10 rivalries
There are a number of intense rivalries within the Atlantic 10, with rivalries that carry over from the Big 5 which includes Saint Joseph's, La Salle, and Temple (now in the American Athletic Conference). URI and UMass also have a long-standing rivalry.  St. Bonaventure and Duquesne also maintain a rivalry that predates their affiliation with the conference. UMass and Temple also had a basketball rivalry while John Chaney was coaching Temple but it has died down a bit since, and even more so now that Temple has left the conference. Due to both teams sharing the Ram mascot, the Fordham - URI rivalry has increased in recent years as the competitions are heralded as "The Battle of the Rams." The long-standing crosstown rivalry between Richmond and VCU, now known as the Capital City Classic, became a conference rivalry with VCU's arrival in the A10.  Rivals St. Louis and Dayton play each year in basketball for the Arch-Baron Cup. George Washington and George Mason compete annually in the Revolutionary Rivalry across all sports.

Sports 
In the 2021–22 academic year, the Atlantic 10 Conference sponsors championship competition in nine men's and twelve women's NCAA sanctioned sports, with lacrosse becoming the 10th sponsored men's sport in 2022–23. In addition to the 15 full members, two Pennsylvania schools, Lock Haven and Saint Francis, are affiliate members in field hockey. High Point and Hobart became men's lacrosse affiliates in July 2022.

Men's sponsored sports by school

Notes

Men's varsity sports not sponsored by the Atlantic 10 Conference which are played by A-10 schools

Notes

Women's sponsored sports by school

Notes

Women's varsity sports not sponsored by the Atlantic 10 Conference which are played by A-10 schools

Notes

Current tournament champions 

The Atlantic 10 Conference sponsors championship competition in nine men's and twelve women's NCAA sanctioned sports, with a tenth men's sport to be added in July 2022.

Regular-season champions are indicated with "(RS)" and tournament champions with "(T)".

Football (1997–2006)

Origin
The A-10 began sponsoring football in 1997 when it absorbed the Yankee Conference, a Division I-AA (now known as Division I FCS) football-only conference. The move was triggered by a change in NCAA rules that reduced the influence of single-sport conferences over NCAA legislation. The following teams were in the Yankee Conference at the time of its demise:
 
 Boston University Terriers football
 Connecticut Huskies football
 Delaware Fightin' Blue Hens football
 James Madison Dukes football
 Maine Black Bears football
 UMass Minutemen football
 New Hampshire Wildcats football
 Northeastern Huskies football
 Rhode Island Rams football
 Richmond Spiders football
 Villanova Wildcats football
 William & Mary Tribe football

Boston University dropped football after the first season of A-10 football. After the 1999 season, UConn started a transition from Division I-AA to Division I-A football (now Division I FBS) that was completed in 2002. In 2004, UConn, already a member of the Big East for other sports, became a football member of that conference. The other schools all remained in the A-10 football conference until the management change after the 2006 season.

Football champions

Demise/"Rename"
The 2005 move of Northeastern University, a football-only member of the A-10, to the Colonial Athletic Association for basketball and Olympic sports began a chain of events that would lead to the demise of the A-10 football conference, at least under the A-10 banner.

At that time, the CAA did not sponsor football, but five of its members in the 2004–05 academic year (Delaware, Hofstra, James Madison, Towson, and William & Mary) were football members of the A-10. The addition of Northeastern gave the CAA six schools with football programs, which under NCAA rules allows a conference to sponsor football. Northeastern agreed to join any future CAA football conference, which meant that the A-10 football conference would drop to six members once CAA football began operation.

With six football members in place, the CAA decided to start a football conference in 2007. The league then invited Richmond, a member of the CAA from 1983 to 2001, to rejoin for football only, because of UR's long-standing in-state rivalries with William & Mary and James Madison. UR accepted the invitation, taking the A-10 football conference below the NCAA minimum of six. Shortly after this, the A-10 football conference opted to disband, with all of its members becoming charter members of the CAA football conference.

A-10 schools in DI-A/FBS
A-10 charter members Penn State, Pittsburgh, Rutgers, West Virginia, and Villanova played I-A football as independents while members of the A-10 in other sports. Villanova became a member of the Big East in 1980 with Pittsburgh following in 1982. Temple joined the A-10 that year. Penn State joined the Big Ten in 1991 (effectively in 1993), and three A-10 members joined the Big East as football-only members: Rutgers, West Virginia, and Temple (only Rutgers and West Virginia would later join the Big East as full members in 1995).

Virginia Tech joined the A-10 in 1995 as a result of the merger that created Conference USA. They would then join the Big East as full members in 2000, following the football program which was already a member of the league. Temple remained a football-only member of the Big East until 2004; they would join the MAC for football in 2007 until 2012, and re-joined the Big East in football for the 2012 season. Temple planned to move the rest of its sports into the Big East in 2013, but the conference realigned into the football-sponsoring American Athletic Conference and a new non-football Big East. Temple joined The American. Massachusetts joined them in FBS football with membership in the MAC beginning in the 2012 season and as an FBS independent beginning in 2016. Charlotte, which started a football program in 2013, left for Conference USA.

Facilities
Future member in gray.

References

External links
 

 
Sports in the Eastern United States
Sports organizations established in 1976
1976 establishments in the United States
Articles which contain graphical timelines